"If I Were You" is the first single released from Hoobastank's third studio album, Every Man for Himself. The song reached number 23 on the Modern Rock chart.

Music video
A music video directed by Hype Williams was released for the song and is shot in black and white. It is the first music video without Markku Lappalainen on bass guitar, leaving Josh Moreau as the stand-in member.

Chart performance

References

2006 singles
Hoobastank songs
Music videos directed by Hype Williams
2006 songs
Island Records singles
Songs written by Dan Estrin
Songs written by Doug Robb
Songs written by Chris Hesse